Callan Mulvey (born 23 February 1975) is an Australian actor. He is best known for his roles as Mark Moran on the Australian drama Underbelly, Sergeant Brendan 'Josh' Joshua in Rush, and as Bogdan Drazic in Heartbreak High. His American roles include Scyllias in 300: Rise of an Empire, Jack Rollins in Captain America: The Winter Soldier (2014) and Avengers: Endgame (2019), and Anatoli Knyazev in Batman v Superman: Dawn of Justice (2016).

Early life
Of Scottish, Irish and Māori descent, Mulvey was born in Auckland, New Zealand, and moved to Australia when he was seven years old, growing up in the northern beaches of Sydney.

Career
Mulvey's personal interest in skateboarding and rollerblading led him to work as a stunt double about two years prior to winning the role of Drazic in Heartbreak High. His first role was of a victim of a robbery in a police training video.

In 2004, he re-entered the spotlight for the release of Thunderstruck.

Mulvey had guest spots on Home and Away (as Johnny Cooper) during 2006 to 2008 and McLeod's Daughters during 2007.

He starred in the 2008 Australian underworld crime show Underbelly as Mark Moran, and appeared in police series Rush as Sgt. Brendan "Josh" Joshua.

In 2012, he starred in the underworld crime miniseries Bikie Wars: Brothers in Arms as Mark Anthony "Snoddy" Spencer.

In 2012, he appeared in Kathryn Bigelow's Zero Dark Thirty as Saber. The following year, he starred in The Turning, directed by Robert Connelly.

In 2014, he appeared in 300: Rise of an Empire as Syllias, as Jack Rollins in Captain America: The Winter Soldier, as Skylar in the Katie Holmes black comedy Miss Meadows, and as Jack Taylor in Kill Me Three Times.

Mulvey played Anatoli Knyazev in Batman v Superman: Dawn of Justice (2016). In the film, Knyazev does not appear as KGBeast and is only a hired gun.

In 2016, he appeared briefly in Warcraft, the film adaptation of the video game Warcraft, in which he was credited as Warrior, as well as joining the main cast of Starz TV's Power, for season three, as Dean. Callan has also completed the horror film Delirium, and is in post-production for the films Beyond Skyline, the sequel to the cult-classic Skyline, and Desolate, a drama based on a family of farmers living in a dystopian future. He filmed Bleeding Steel, a science fiction thriller starring Jackie Chan. Mulvey is also filming In Like Flynn, a biopic of Errol Flynn's early years.

Personal life
He was trapped in the vehicle for almost an hour until he could be freed from the wreckage. The midsection of his face completely collapsed, an incision was made from ear to ear over the top of his scalp, his face "pulled down" and 17 titanium plates were then inserted to repair the fractures to his face and jaw. His left knee and ankle were also badly fractured. Mulvey also permanently lost his vision in his left eye.

He married Rachel Thomas, an academic and musician, in Byron Bay in 2010.

Filmography

Films

Television

References

External links
 

Australian male film actors
Australian male television actors
Australian people of Māori descent
Australian people of Irish descent
Australian people of Scottish descent
Living people
1975 births
New Zealand emigrants to Australia
People from Auckland